"Work It Out" is a house music song by Chicago based producer Steve "Silk" Hurley featuring rap vocals by M. Doc.

Release
The song was released on Atlantic Records in 1989 as the lead single taken from Hurley's Work It Out Compilation, which featured additional seven tracks, partially recorded in collaboration with Jamie Principle. The 12" release contained a short radio edit, the full album version, an extended remix and two acid house versions of the song.

Credits and personnel
Steve Hurley - writer, producer, mix, engineer, edit
M-Doc - featured artist
Larry Sturm - engineer
Frank Rodrigo - executive producer

Success
On the U.S. Billboard Hot Dance Music/Club Play the single peaked at number three.

Official versions
"Work It Out (LP Version)" - 5:07
"Work It Out (Radio Edit" - 4:23
"Work It Out (Acid Mix)" - 6:10
"Work It Out (Acid Dub)" - 4:55
"Work It Out (Extended Remix)" - 6:20

Charts and sales

Peak positions

References

External links
 Work it Out on Discogs

1989 singles
1989 songs
Steve "Silk" Hurley songs
Songs written by Steve "Silk" Hurley
Atlantic Records singles